David Fletcher may refer to:

 David Fletcher (baseball) (born 1994), American baseball player
 David Fletcher (bishop) (died 1665), Bishop of Argyll in Scotland
 David Fletcher (cartoonist) (born 1952), New Zealand cartoonist
 David Fletcher (cricketer) (1924–2015), British cricketer
 David Fletcher (cyclist) (born 1989), British cross-country mountain biker and cyclo-cross rider
 David Fletcher (military historian) (born 1942), British military historian
 David Fletcher (musician) (1971–2009), British musician